Meeks is an unincorporated community in Johnson County, in the U.S. state of Georgia.

History
The first permanent settlement at Meeks was made ca. 1888. A post office called Meeks was established in 1893, and remained in operation until 1954. The community has the name of Henry Meeks, an early settler.

References

Unincorporated communities in Johnson County, Georgia
Unincorporated communities in Georgia (U.S. state)